With Teeth (stylized as [WITH_TEETH]) is the fourth studio album by American industrial rock band Nine Inch Nails, released by Nothing Records and Interscope Records on May 3, 2005. The album was produced by Nine Inch Nails frontman Trent Reznor and long-time collaborator Alan Moulder. It also features contributions from musician Dave Grohl and future band member Atticus Ross.

In line with the band's previous material, the record features introspective songwriting influenced by Reznor's addiction to alcohol and drugs and subsequent sobriety. The album generated three singles: "The Hand That Feeds", "Only", and "Every Day Is Exactly the Same", the latter of which was released as an accompanying remix EP. The album was supported by the Live: With Teeth tour.

With Teeth was well received by critics, albeit slightly less than the band's previous work. Some complimented the aggressive composition, while others said the album was bland and criticized Reznor for a lack of originality. The album became the band's second to reach No. 1 in the U.S. and was certified gold by the RIAA.

Background
Nine Inch Nails garnered mainstream attention with their influential second album The Downward Spiral, as well as a widely broadcast live performance at Woodstock '94, becoming one of the most popular music acts of the 1990s. Reznor appeared in Time magazine's list of the year's most influential people in 1997, and Spin magazine described him as "the most vital artist in music". However, his musical output was infrequent, having released only three studio albums from 1989 to 2005 with a rough average of five years between each release. During this time, Reznor became increasingly addicted to alcohol and drugs, resulting in depression and writer's block.

The 1999 Nine Inch Nails double album The Fragile was met with generally positive reviews from music critics and eventually sold 898,000 copies. However, it failed to attain the success of its predecessor and fell from the top of the Billboard charts after only a week. Afterwards, the only original Nine Inch Nails material released until 2005 was the 2000 remix album Things Falling Apart, as well as the 2001 remix album Still and the 2001 single "Deep" from the Lara Croft: Tomb Raider soundtrack. Reznor told Spin magazine in 2005, "I was going to just drink myself or drug myself out of it. I got back to New Orleans after the Fragile tour, and I'd pretty much lost my soul."

Writing and recording

Songwriting
After Reznor decided to go to rehab, he began work on a new album and found that the songwriting process moved along easier for him than in the past. He said that it was due to having "a pretty good game plan" and elaborated, "I had themes and subjects [...] as my brain started working, the songs just started to come out. I regained my self-confidence." He originally planned the album to be a concept album, complete with a storyline. He was quoted in a 2007 article as saying, "I'd come up with this kind of elaborate storyline, and the record was gonna be a concept record that had a number of pretentious elements to it. I was gonna talk about multi-layered reality and waking up in a dream you can't wake up out of, and eventually finding acceptance after you go through this period of trying to fight it. It was all kind of a big analogy for me getting sober."

Nothing Studios sessions
Reznor began recording the album at Nothing Studios in New Orleans, the last release he recorded at the location before permanently relocating to Los Angeles. The album was produced by Reznor and long-time Nine Inch Nails producer Alan Moulder, with engineering and assistance by Atticus Ross, who would later join the band as its second official member in 2016. The album was mixed in stereo and 5.1 surround sound. Nirvana drummer and Foo Fighters frontman Dave Grohl contributed drums and percussion on seven tracks. According to a statement on the official Nine Inch Nails website, Reznor stated that producer Rick Rubin was his "mentor" and "source of inspiration" throughout the planning and writing process of the album.

Reznor was heavily inspired by the use of more analog electronic effects and instruments, specifically tape delay and modular synthesizers. A post on the band's official website dated May 5 indicated that Reznor, Ross, and Leo Herrera were in the studio recording and "refining" rough new material. It also stated Jerome Dillon was on drums on these sessions. Mixing began on October 28, and Reznor revealed on New Year's Eve that the album was complete and would be titled With Teeth.

Music and lyrics

Before the album's release, Reznor described With Teeth as "more song-oriented" and "lean" than The Fragile (1999). In reference to the album's sound, Reznor said he "tried to keep a lo-fi aesthetic running through it, a kind of carelessness."  Moreover, he stated the music was less of a concept album, and more of "a collection of songs that are friends with each other, but don't have to rely on each other to make sense". With Teeth is considered as Reznor's most rock-centric album since the Broken EP and labeled as industrial rock, electronic rock, and hard rock. The album's sound also draws inspirations from genres such as drum and bass, pop, electronica, and ambient.

The album's lyrics tackle Reznor's opinion of himself, his relationship with the world around him and his place in it, and his struggles with addiction. Although it dealt with these issues, Reznor was hopeful that it was still "disguised enough that [it was] not a terribly boring record about recovery and addiction". Reznor also drew influence from the September 11, 2001 attacks, which occurred shortly after his recovery. The album's first single, "The Hand That Feeds", was a direct example of the themes of protest and propagandist fear that helped influence the album. These influences became more prominent in his next album, Year Zero, and the alternate reality game that accompanied it.

Title and packaging

Early reports indicated that the album had a working title of Bleedthrough. Reznor stated that the name was eventually changed: "It was supposed to be about different layers of reality seeping into the next, but I think some people were thinking about blood or a tampon commercial."

In a statement to fans on the official Nine Inch Nails website, Reznor explained that his dislike for the constraints of CD artwork led to the creation of a downloadable 20-megabyte  poster, incorporating credits, lyrics, and artwork. The poster, designed by Reznor and Rob Sheridan, contains lyrics that are not featured in the actual songs (a practice Reznor has continued since Pretty Hate Machine), as well as song titles and lyrics not featured on the album, possibly recorded but unreleased. The poster is available to members of the official Nine Inch Nails fan club as part of the initial welcome package.

With Teeth is the last Nine Inch Nails studio album to include the Nothing Records logo in the packaging, since it was declared extinct after the February 2007 inclusion of the Beside You in Time home video. Before the release of the album, fans were able to listen to With Teeth in its entirety by attending listening parties that took place in 13 cities throughout the U.S. Anyone who attended received promotional posters and stickers. Those who pre-ordered the album received a limited edition 7" vinyl containing the single "The Hand That Feeds," as well as the B-side track "Home." The album was promoted with seven short teaser trailers. The Fragile, Things Falling Apart, and Year Zero were also promoted with trailers, as well as commercials.

With Teeth was released as a standard CD, double vinyl, a DualDisc and a CD/DVD combo. In addition to 5.1 surround and stereo mixes of the songs, the DualDisc (and DVD) contain the video for "The Hand That Feeds", an interactive discography and a slide show of album artwork. Reznor also released multitrack files for a few of the songs.  In retrospect Reznor said, "That whole idea of putting up multitracks, really was just, several years ago, bored in a hotel room [...] just as an experiment I happened to have the multitracks with me--I think I was doing press for With Teeth--I loaded up "The Hand That Feeds" and made it as a multitrack, in GarageBand. [...] I thought it would be cool to give the sounds to people, and I knew the challenge would be to get that past Interscope, essentially giving the masters out.  But they agreed."  Reznor has released multitrack files for every major Nine Inch Nails release up to, and including, The Slip.

In June 2015, an instrumental version of the album was released to Apple Music. A remastered "Definitive Edition" was released on vinyl and digital in November 2019.

Live: With Teeth tour

Nine Inch Nails live performances supported the album with a tour named Live: With Teeth. The touring lineup featured Jeordie White, Aaron North, Alessandro Cortini, and Jerome Dillon.  Midway through the tour, Dillon was forced to stop playing due to a medical condition. He was initially replaced by Alex Carapetis, and then later by Josh Freese.

The tour began with a small club tour in early 2005, and the band members were reportedly "pleasantly surprised by the interest" despite the group's lengthy hiatus between tours.  This initial leg of the tour also included a headlining performance at Coachella Valley Music and Arts Festival. The band followed up with a North American arena tour in autumn 2005, supported by Queens of the Stone Age, Autolux, Death from Above 1979, and hip hop artist Saul Williams.  The second leg of the tour consisted of a series of North American amphitheaters performances in the summer of 2006, supported by Bauhaus, TV on the Radio, and Peaches. In 2007, a tour documentary entitled Beside You in Time was released in DVD, HD DVD, and Blu-ray formats.

Critical reception

With Teeth received mostly positive reviews from critics, with an aggregate rating of 71 based on 22 reviews on Metacritic.  Rolling Stone's Rob Sheffield described the album as "vintage Nine Inch Nails", while Stylus Magazine said "The words 'triumphant return' are apt." Rock critic Robert Christgau gave it a lukewarm review, commenting, "All pretense of deeper meaning worn into shtick, [Reznor] is left with the aggro mood music that was always his calling." Newsday gave With Teeth a rating of A− and called it "a strong reminder why, despite his lengthy absences, Reznor remains alt-rock royalty."

Other critics panned the album, including The Village Voice, which described the album as "all paint-by-numbers with no topography or relief—just one angry distorted chord after another." PopMatters critically slammed the album, summarizing its poor review by simply saying "Trent Reznor has run out of ideas." In the review for AllMusic, editor Stephen Thomas Erlewine was also muted in his praise for the album, claiming that "[It] is the work of a craftsman, a musician who meticulously assembles his work by layering details so densely, there's never a moment on the record where something isn't roiling under the surface, where something isn't added to the mix. He's good at this, though. With Teeth is an impressive achievement technically and the music is generally strong, yet there's a nagging problem -- namely, there's nothing new here."

With Teeth was named one of the top 40 albums of 2005 by Spin magazine.  The song "The Hand That Feeds" was nominated for Best Hard Rock Performance for the 48th Annual Grammy Awards in 2006.  The song "Every Day Is Exactly the Same" was nominated for a Grammy Award in 2007. Pitchfork named "The Hand That Feeds" in its "Top 500 Tracks of the 2000s", at number 406.  In 2005, Reznor was nominated by the Billboard Music Awards as the "Modern Rock Artist of the Year".

Commercial performance
With Teeth debuted at number one on the US Billboard 200, selling 272,000 copies in its first week. The album has been certified gold in the United States and the United Kingdom and platinum in Canada.

Track listing
All songs written, composed and performed by Trent Reznor.

The track "Home" was originally a B-side to "The Hand That Feeds".  On CD versions the track is placed after the last track, on vinyl it is placed after "Sunspots".  As mentioned above, the UK version also features an additional track, an alternate version of "Right Where it Belongs", and the Japanese version also contains the alternate track, as well as a remix of "The Hand That Feeds" by Photek, bringing its track total to 16.

Note
Two more tracks recorded during the With Teeth sessions but never made it to the final track listing were "Non-Entity" and "Not So Pretty Now". Those can be found on the NINJA 2009 Tour Sampler.

Personnel

Trent Reznor – lead vocals, arranging, performance, songwriting, production, engineering, 5.1 surround mix, sound design, all instrumentals & instrumentation
Alan Moulder – additional instrumentals, production, engineering
Atticus Ross – programming, additional production, sound design
Leo Herrera – engineering, project coordination
James Brown – engineering, 5.1 surround mix
Rich Costey – engineering
Tom Baker at Precision Mastering – mastering
Adam Ayan for Gateway Mastering – surround mastering
Rob Sheridan – design
Jeremy Berman – drum technician
Gerch for Drum Fetish – drum technician
Jerome Dillon – additional drum programming, live drums (7, 14)
Rupert Parkes – additional programming (1)
Alien Tom – turntables (1)
Dave Grohl – percussion (1), drums (2, 3, 6, 9, 10, 11)

Charts

Weekly charts

Year-end charts

Certifications

See also
 Nine Inch Nails discography
 List of Billboard 200 number-one albums of 2005

References

2005 albums
Albums produced by Alan Moulder
Albums produced by Trent Reznor
Interscope Geffen A&M Records albums
Interscope Records albums
Nine Inch Nails albums
Nothing Records albums
Albums recorded at Sound City Studios